The 1986 Can-Am season was the nineteenth running of the Sports Car Club of Americas prototype series, and the tenth running of the revived series. The dominant manufacturers were Cosworth, BMW, and Volkswagen for the first time with a third-place finish at Summit Point. The dominant chassis were Lola, March, Oscella, Yorkshire, Frissbee-Lola, and Frissbee. After 1986, Can Am would become the Can Am Teams championship, using modified CART March 86Cs. In 1989, the name was again revived with a spec Shelby series. Horst Kroll was declared champion.

The season did, however, introduce a young Paul Tracy, who won the final round at Mosport at the age of seventeen.

Results

References

Can-Am seasons
1986 in American motorsport
1986 in Canadian motorsport